Frits Kemp (born February 26, 1954) is a Dutch attorney, receiver and activist. Kemp has been a lawyer since 1988 and founded the law firm, FORT in 2001 together with three other partners. On December the 4, 2014 Kemp gained national attention after becoming the receiver of Dutch fashion brand Mexx declaring its 315 stores bankrupt.

Kemp is a member of the activist group 1Overheid, A team of experts in law and finance aiming to prevent fraud in the Netherlands.

References

Living people
20th-century Dutch lawyers
1954 births
21st-century Dutch lawyers